Alain De Roo (born 27 November 1955) is a Belgian former professional racing cyclist. He rode in two editions of the Tour de France.

References

External links

1955 births
Living people
Belgian male cyclists
Sportspeople from Ghent
Cyclists from East Flanders